Weatherboard is a locality in western Victoria, Australia. At the 2021 census, Weatherboard and the surrounding area had a population of 52.

Anecdotally, named such as is believed to have been the first place in the region to have a home built using weatherboard rather than corrugated iron, stone or bricks etc.

References

Towns in Victoria (Australia)